The 2011 Borno State gubernatorial election was the 7th gubernatorial election of Borno State. Held on April 26, 2011, the All Nigeria Peoples Party nominee Kashim Shettima won the election, defeating Mohammed Goni of the People's Democratic Party.

Results 
A total of 12 candidates contested in the election. Kashim Shettima from the All Nigeria Peoples Party won the election, defeating Mohammed Goni from the People's Democratic Party. Registered voters was 2,236,159, valid votes was 1,050,796, votes cast was 1,113,117, 62,321 votes was cancelled.

References 

Borno State gubernatorial elections
Borno gubernatorial